KDJI (1270 AM) is a radio station  broadcasting a News Talk Information format. Licensed to Holbrook, Arizona, United States, the station is currently owned by Petracom of Holbrook, L.L.C. and features programming from ABC Radio and Premiere Radio Networks.

History
In 2004, the station, along with KVWM, began broadcasting the News/Talk format that is still carried on the stations today.

References

External links
 Facebook
 FCC History Cards for KDJI
 KDJI website

DJI